The Strahan–Zeehan Railway, also known as the "Government Railway", was a railway from Strahan to Zeehan on the west coast of Tasmania.

It linked two private railways: the Mount Lyell Mining and Railway Company railway line (now known as the West Coast Wilderness Railway) between Queenstown and Regatta Point, and the Emu Bay Railway between Zeehan and Burnie.

Early photographs of the Strahan wharf and buildings adjacent taken from the north usually have the railway tracks in the lower section of the photograph, as the line followed the shore from Regatta Point around the bay before passing northward in what is considered to be West Strahan today.

The line ran parallel to Ocean Beach before heading towards Zeehan.

It was a critical link, due to the difficulties of shipping negotiating the entrance Macquarie Harbour and was essential during the 1912 North Mount Lyell disaster. The track gauge of the lines between Burnie was the same all the way to Queenstown.

Flooding and fire affected the most important link, the Henty Bridge, at stages in the line's history.  1920 was one year where the break in the line is recorded.

The line was heavily reliant upon the mining industry and its fortunes, and traffic reduced drastically at times of mining down-turns.

Following its closure, parts became tracks and eventually the formation was made into the Zeehan-Strahan Road.

Dates
The line was opened on 4 February 1892, and it was closed 2 June 1960.

Stations and stopping places
 Zeehan
 Silver Bell
 Austral
 Oceana Junction
 Professor 
 Grieves Siding 
 Eden
 Powell's Siding 
 Mallana—renamed Fowler's Siding 
 Henty Bridge—renamed Koyule (1926) 
 Henty
 Beach Road—also known as Ocean Beach
 Bellinger  
 Opah—renamed Stella (1903) 
 West Strahan
 Strahan Wharf 
 Regatta Point

See also
 Railways on the West Coast of Tasmania

References

Further reading

3 ft 6 in gauge railways in Australia
Closed railway lines in Tasmania
Railway lines opened in 1892
Railway lines closed in 1960
Railway lines in Western Tasmania
Strahan, Tasmania
Zeehan
1892 establishments in Australia